Taybat al-Ism is a Syrian village located in the Suran Subdistrict in Hama District. According to the Syria Central Bureau of Statistics (CBS), Taybat al-Ism had a population of 463 in the 2004 census.

References 

Populated places in Hama District